Squirrel fish is a well-known dish in Jiangsu cuisine, originally from Suzhou. It is prepared by deboning and carving a mandarin fish into an ornamental shape similar to a squirrel, and then deep-frying it in batter before dousing it in sweet and sour sauce.

See Also 
 West Lake Fish in Vinegar Gravy (西湖醋鱼), a similarly famous fish dish from Hangzhou

References 

Fish dishes
Jiangsu cuisine